North East Lanarkshire was a county constituency of the House of Commons of the Parliament of the United Kingdom (Westminster) from 1885 to 1918. It elected one Member of Parliament (MP) by the first past the post voting system.

Boundaries 

The name relates the constituency to the county of Lanark. The Redistribution of Seats Act 1885 provided that the North-East division was to consist of "the parishes of New Monkland, Shotts, Dalziel, Bothwell, and so much of the parish of Hamilton as lies north and east of the River Clyde".

Members of Parliament

Election results

Elections in the 1880s

Elections in the 1890s

Elections in the 1900s

Elections in the 1910s

Notes and References 
Notes

References

Historic parliamentary constituencies in Scotland (Westminster)
Lanarkshire
Constituencies of the Parliament of the United Kingdom established in 1885
Constituencies of the Parliament of the United Kingdom disestablished in 1918